James E. Rogers (September 15, 1938 – June 14, 2014) was an American entrepreneur and former attorney. He served as interim chancellor of the Nevada System of Higher Education and the University of Arizona College of Law carries his name.

Biography

Early life and education
Rogers was a 1956 graduate of Las Vegas High School. He had degrees in accounting (B.S.) and law (LL.B.) from the University of Arizona and a Master of Laws (LL.M.) from the University of Southern California. He was a teaching fellow in the law school of the University of Illinois in 1963 and 1964. In 1998 he was awarded a Doctor of Laws (LL.D.) from the University of Arizona. Rogers holds honorary doctorates from University of Arizona, Idaho State University, Kentucky Wesleyan College, Carroll College and University of Nevada, Las Vegas. He was also a member of the State Bar Associations of Nevada, Arizona and California.

Career
He was the founder of Valley Broadcasting Company in 1971 and had served as the company's chief executive officer from 1979 to 2014 on KVBC-TV (now KSNV), the NBC affiliate in Las Vegas, The station went on the air as KLRJ-TV on channel 2 on January 23, 1955, licensed to Henderson and owned by the Donrey Media Group (now Stephens Media LLC) along with the Las Vegas Review-Journal and KORK radio (920 AM; now KBAD). Soon after, the station changed its calls to KORK-TV, matching its radio sister, and moved its license and studios to Las Vegas. The station became a primary affiliate of NBC, but carried other networks as well. During the late 1950s, the station was also briefly affiliated with the NTA Film Network.

In 1967, KORK-TV moved to channel 3 to avoid interference with newly signed-on KTVN in Reno, Nevada.

From 1971 onward, a group of local residents led by Las Vegas attorney James E. "Jim" Rogers made an effort to take control of KORK. The group gained further momentum in the late 1970s after Donrey began heavily preempting NBC programming in order to sell more local advertising, though NBC was far less tolerant of this than the other networks at the time. The most notable of these preemptions was the 1978 World Series, angering both NBC and several Las Vegas area viewers, some of whom complained to the Federal Communications Commission. Facing pressure from both NBC and the FCC, Donrey was forced to sell the station to the Rogers group's holding company, Valley Broadcasting Company, in 1979. Donrey retained KORK radio, and as a result on October 1, 1979, the station became KVBC, reflecting the new ownership. Since then, the station has more or less cleared the whole NBC lineup.

Rogers owns 98% of the stock of Sunbelt Communications Company (now Intermountain West Communications Company), which owns and operates the NBC affiliate television stations in Las Vegas, Reno and Elko, Nevada; Yuma, Arizona-El Centro, California; Helena, Montana; Pocatello-Idaho Falls, Idaho; Casper, Wyoming; and the Fox affiliate in Twin Falls, Idaho.

Rogers was in active law practice in Las Vegas from 1964 through 1988, at which time he ceased practicing to devote 100% of his time to the development of the television and radio stations of Sunbelt.

Rogers became a member of the Board of Directors of Nevada National Bank in 1981 (the third largest bank in Nevada), served as a member of the bank's Loan Committee for ten years and was chairman of the board from 1985 to 1987. He was involved in the purchase of Nevada National Bank by Security Pacific Bank of California in 1989, and served on the board of directors of Security Pacific Bank, Nevada until it was purchased by Bank of America. He was a founder and served on the board of directors of Community Bank of Nevada, and was chairman of its Loan Committee until he left that bank to form Nevada First Bank in 1998. He is a founder and presently serves as the chairman of the board of Nevada First Bank.

Rogers was appointed by the Board of Regents to serve as the UCCSN's Interim Chancellor on May 7, 2004.

Philanthropic activity
An active supporter of education, he and his wife, Beverly, have made substantial financial contributions to various colleges and universities.  Their gift to the University of Arizona College of Law totaled $115 million. In November 1998, the Arizona Board of Regents renamed the University of Arizona college of Law James E. Rogers College of Law.

Active in all the communities in which Sunbelt has television stations, Rogers serves as a member of the Dean's Advisory Council of the University of Nevada, Engineering College in Reno, Nevada (to which he has given or pledged $750,000); is a member of the Dean's Council of the UNLV College of Law in Las Vegas (to which he has given or pledged $28,500,000); and is a member and President-Elect of the Idaho State University Foundation in Pocatello, Idaho  (to which he has given or pledged $20 million). Sunbelt has constructed a building on the campus of Great Basin Community College in Elko, Nevada at a cost to Sunbelt of approximately $1.25 million.  This building formerly housed the studios for KENV-DT, along with classrooms for teaching communications.

Marriage and children
He was married to Beverly Barlow. Jim Rogers had 3 children from a previous marriage: Suzanne Rogers Plant, Kimberly Rogers Cell, and Perry Rogers; and eight grandchildren.

He announced in early 2014 that when he died (June 14, 2014), his wife, Beverly, would take over ownership of the television stations. The flagship station was later sold to Sinclair Broadcast Group which effectively made Intermountain West Communications Company as a defunct company.

References

External links
 
 

1938 births
2014 deaths
American mass media owners
Lawyers from Louisville, Kentucky
Deaths from cancer
Nevada lawyers
People from the Las Vegas Valley
Carroll College (Montana) alumni
Idaho State University alumni
Kentucky Wesleyan College alumni
University of Arizona alumni
USC Gould School of Law alumni
Businesspeople from Louisville, Kentucky
20th-century American businesspeople
20th-century American lawyers
Philanthropists from Kentucky
Philanthropists from Nevada